The Emperor's Candlesticks (German: Die Leuchter des Kaisers) is a 1936 Austrian historical adventure film directed by Karl Hartl and starring Sybille Schmitz, Karl Ludwig Diehl and Friedl Czepa. It is an adaptation of the 1899 novel The Emperor's Candlesticks by Baroness Orczy. A Hollywood film version of the story The Emperor's Candlesticks was released the following year.

It was shot at Sascha Film's Sievering Studios and Rosenhügel Studios in Vienna. The film's sets were designed by the art directors Kurt Herlth, Werner Schlichting and Emil Stepanek. It premiered at the Gloria-Palast in Berlin, and a month later in Vienna.

Cast
 Sybille Schmitz as Anna Demidow 
 Karl Ludwig Diehl as Georg Wolenski 
 Friedl Czepa as Maria 
 Inge List as Zofe bei Anna Demidow 
 Anton Edthofer as Erzherzog Ludwig 
 Max Gülstorff as Graf Surowkin 
 Johannes Heesters as Grossfürst Peter Alexandrowitsch 
 Fritz Rasp as Stanislaus 
 Heinrich Schroth as Der Führer der Verschworenen 
 Jane Tilden as Ein Stubenmädchen 
 Hans Unterkircher
 Fritz Imhoff
 Reinhold Häussermann
 Hans Siebert
 Babette Devrient
 Wilhelm Schich
 Dora Seifert
 Otto Storm
 Robert Valberg
 Kurt von Lessen

Reception
Writing for The Spectator in 1936, Graham Greene gave the film a mildly good review, summarizing the audience experience as "good direction, fair acting, and the attractively Baker Street dresses make this a pleasant film to doze at."

References

Bibliography 
 Bock, Hans-Michael & Bergfelder, Tim. The Concise Cinegraph: Encyclopaedia of German Cinema. Berghahn Books, 2009.
 Von Dassanowsky, Robert. Screening Transcendence: Film Under Austrofascism and the Hollywood Hope, 1933-1938. Indiana University Press, 2018

External links 
 

1936 films
1930s German-language films
Films directed by Karl Hartl
Austrian black-and-white films
1930s historical adventure films
Austrian historical adventure films
Films set in the 19th century
Films shot at Rosenhügel Studios
Films shot at Sievering Studios
Films based on British novels
Films set in Vienna